Truth and Justice is an Estonian novel written in written 1926 to 1933.

Truth and Justice can refer to:

 Truth and Justice (1916 film)
 Truth and Justice (2019 film)
 Truth and Justice (Afghanistan), an Afghan political party
 Truth and Justice Alliance, a Romanian political party
 Truth & Justice, a tabletop role-playing game
 Truth & Justice (podcast)

See also